Daily tous les jours is a Canadian art and design studio based in Montreal, Quebec, Canada. It specializes in participative public art installations. Its best known project is 21 Balançoires (the Musical Swings).

History
Daily tous les jours was founded by Mouna Andraos and Melissa Mongiat.

Daily tous les jours' installation 21 Balançoires, originally located in Montreal's Promenade des Artistes in the Quartier des Spectacles, was developed in 2011 with the help off behavioural scientist Luc-Alain Giraldeau and musician Radwan Ghazi Moumneh. Visitors work together to elicit musical patterns and melodies. The piece has been described by Oprah Winfrey as a "living piece of art". The exhibit was set up in Oklahoma City in 2019.

In 2012 the pair developed an interactive art installation, Operette, which allowed members of the public to take part in live action role playing.

The studio has exhibited I Heard There Was a Secret Chord, a digital choir based on online music streaming; originally presented at the Musée d'art contemporain de Montréal, the artwork also toured at the Jewish Museum (Manhattan), and the Somerset House and several other museums. The work has received mixed reviews.

Daily tous les jours designed the exhibit space for the Toronto offices of Sidewalk Labs, including flexible seating and neighbourhood design tools.

Awards
Throughout the years, Daily tous les jours has won international recognitions, including the Grand Prize at the UNESCO Shenzhen Design Awards, Best in Show at the IxDA Interaction Awards in 2013, a Fast Company Innovation by Design Award, a Knight Cities Challenge for Civic Innovation, and an Americans for the Arts Public Art Network Award.

External links 
 About Daily tous les Jours

References

Canadian companies established in 2010
Companies based in Montreal
2010 establishments in Quebec
Design companies established in 2010